Árpád Nemessányi (born 15 May 1944) is a Hungarian weightlifter. He competed at the 1964 Summer Olympics and the 1968 Summer Olympics.

References

1944 births
Living people
Hungarian male weightlifters
Olympic weightlifters of Hungary
Weightlifters at the 1964 Summer Olympics
Weightlifters at the 1968 Summer Olympics
Sportspeople from Budapest
20th-century Hungarian people